Boreophilia is a genus of rove beetles in the family Staphylinidae. There are more than 20 described species in Boreophilia.

Species
These 21 species belong to the genus Boreophilia:

 Boreophilia angusticornis (Bernhauer, 1907)
 Boreophilia beringi Klimaszewski & Brunke, 2019
 Boreophilia caseyi Lohse in Lohse, Klimaszewski and Smetana, 1990
 Boreophilia davidgei Klimaszewski & Godin, 2012
 Boreophilia eremita (Rye, 1866)
 Boreophilia fusca (C. Sahlberg, 1831)
 Boreophilia gelida (J. Sahlberg, 1887)
 Boreophilia hercynica (Renkonen, 1936)
 Boreophilia hyperborea (Brundin, 1940)
 Boreophilia insecuta (Eppelsheim, 1893)
 Boreophilia islandica (Kraatz, 1857)
 Boreophilia latifemorata (Brundin, 1940)
 Boreophilia manitobensis Lohse in Lohse, Klimaszewski and Smetana, 1990
 Boreophilia nearctica Lohse in Lohse, Klimaszewski and Smetana, 1990
 Boreophilia neoinsecuta Klimaszewski 2019
 Boreophilia nomensis (Casey, 1910)
 Boreophilia ovalis Klimaszewski & Langor, 2011
 Boreophilia piligera (J Sahlberg, 1876)
 Boreophilia subplana (J. Sahlberg, 1880)
 Boreophilia vega (Fenyes, 1920)
 Boreophilia venti (Lohse in Lohse, Klimaszewski and Smetana, 1990)

References

Further reading

 
 
 
 

Aleocharinae